Mooloolah was an electoral district of the Legislative Assembly in the Australian state of Queensland from 1992 to 2001.

The district was situated in the Sunshine Coast and named for the community of Mooloolah.

Members for Mooloolah

Election results

See also
 Electoral districts of Queensland
 Members of the Queensland Legislative Assembly by year
 :Category:Members of the Queensland Legislative Assembly by name

References

Former electoral districts of Queensland
1992 establishments in Australia
2001 disestablishments in Australia
Constituencies established in 1992
Constituencies disestablished in 2001